Uncontrolled may refer to:

Entertainment

Music
 Uncontrolled (album), a 2012 album by Japanese musician Namie Amuro
 Uncontrolled Substance, a 1999 album by Wu-Tang Clan artist Inspectah Deck
 Spiritually Uncontrolled Art, 1992 by Swedish death metal group Liers in Wait

Science and technology
 Uncontrolled decompression, an unplanned for drop in pressure
 Uncontrolled format string, a security software vulnerability

Other
 Uncontrolled airspace, an area of the world where air traffic control is deemed unnecessary
 Uncontrolled intersection, a road intersection without signals such as traffic lights or signs
 Uncontrolled waste, a category of hazardous waste

See also
 Control (disambiguation)
 Control point (disambiguation)
 Controller (disambiguation)